Sh2-9, also known as Gum 65, is combination emission and reflection nebula in the Scorpius constellation, surrounding the multiple star system Sigma Scorpii. Sigma Scorpii is 1° to the northwest of Messier 4, and the nebula can be easily seen with small telescopes.

Sharpless 9 is a red emission nebula that surrounds the star Sigma Scorpii. It is thought the star Sigma Scorpii, a variable giant star, is ionizing this region. It is also recorded as reflection nebula C130.

This region is noted as both an emission and reflection nebula, although sometimes only one aspect is noted.

The magnitude 1.1 Antares is 2° to the southeast of this nebula.

One of strongest 2.3 GHz sources in the region coincides with Sharpless 9.

There is a radio source on the edge, and it has been proposed that this is because there is a collision between this nebula and the dark nebula Kh 527.

Catalogs 
Examples:

 Sharpless 9
 Gum 65
 Cederblad 140

References

External links
Image of Sharpless-2 9 

Scorpius (constellation)
Emission nebulae
Reflection nebulae